Karl Seebach (June 28, 1912 in Munich – July 18, 2007 in Munich) was a German mathematician.

Seebach earned his doctorate at the University of Munich  under Heinrich Tietze and Arnold Sommerfeld, in 1938.  From 1977 to 1981, he held the Chair for Didactics of Mathematics at the University of Munich.

Seebach was the author of many mathematics textbooks for the Gymnasium.

Books
Josef Breuer, Paul Knabe, Josef Lauter, Karl Seebach, and Klaus Wigand Handbuch der Schulmatematik: Band 2 Algebra (Hermann Schroedel)
Johannes Blume, Gerhard Frey, Heinrich Gall, Paul Knabe, Paul Mönnig, Karl Seebach, and Klaus Wigand Handbuch der Schulmathematik: Band 5 Einzelfragen der Mathematik (Hermann Schroedel)
Ludwig Schecher and Karl Seebach  Einführung in die Mathematik. Bd. 1 (Schmidt, 1950) 
Karl Seebach and Reinhold Federle Vorschläge zum Aufbau der Analytischen Geometrie in vektorieller Behandlung  (Ehrenwirth, 1965) 
Friedrich Barth, Karl Seebach, and Ernst Winkler  Vorschläge zur Behandlung der geometrischen Abbildungen in der Ebene  (Ehrenwirth, 1968) 
Karl Seebach and Edmund Kösel  Arbeitsblätter zum Lehrerkolleg. Hauptschule. Schuljahr  9. H. 3. Mathematik, Physik, Chemie  (TR-Verlagsunion, 1969)

Notes

1912 births
20th-century German mathematicians
Mathematics educators
German textbook writers
Ludwig Maximilian University of Munich alumni
Academic staff of the Ludwig Maximilian University of Munich
2007 deaths